Ian Bruce Carrick Kiernan  (4 October 1940 – 16 October 2018) was an Australian yachtsman, property developer, builder, and environmental campaigner, known for co-founding with Kim McKay the not-for-profit Clean Up Australia campaign in 1989 and, in 1993, a similar Clean Up the World operation, serving as the event's chairman, the annual initiative attracted participation from 30 million volunteers in 80 countries.

Early life
Kiernan was born in Sydney to George Arthur and Leslie Katherine Kiernan. He was educated at The Scots College in Sydney, The Armidale School in northern New South Wales, and the Sydney Technical College, where he trained as a builder.

Career
Kiernan was a yachtsman, sailing competitively for more than 40 years and representing Australia at the Admiral's, Southern Cross, Dunhill, Clipper, Kenwood and Trans Pacific Cup competitions. In 1986/87 Kiernan represented Australia in the BOC Challenge solo around-the-world yacht race. He finished 6th out of a fleet of 25 yachts from 11 countries, setting an Australian record for a solo circumnavigation of the world.

Clean-up
During the BOC Challenge,  Kiernan  was appalled by the amount of rubbish choking the world's oceans.  With the support of a committee of friends, he organised a community event – Clean Up Sydney Harbour on Sunday 8 January 1989. 40,000 volunteers turned out to help and collected over 5000 tonnes. 

The success of the first  event in 1989 sparked national interest. Since then more than seven million people have heeded the call through annual Clean Up Australia Days, Friday Schools Clean Up Days and Business Clean Ups. Clean up Australia's mission is "To inspire and work with communities to clean up and fix up our Earth." The first "Clean Up the World" event took place in 1993. By 2007 some 35 million people from 80 nations turned out to clean up their part of the world and in 2017 it was estimated that 120 nations took part.

Awards
Kiernan's environmental efforts were  recognised in 1991 when the Australian Government awarded him the Medal of the Order of Australia (OAM). He was awarded Australian of the Year in 1994. During the ceremony he assisted the Premier of New South Wales, John Fahey, stopping a "pseudo assassination" attempt on Charles, Prince of Wales. In 1995, he was appointed an Officer (AO) of the Order of Australia.

In 1998, Kiernan was the recipient of the UNEP Sasakawa Prize. The prize is awarded every year to individuals with an established track record of achievement and the potential to make outstanding contributions to the protection and management of the environment consistent with UNEP's policies and objectives. He received the World Citizenship Award from the World Association of Girl Guides and Girl Scouts in 1999.

In 2001, Kiernan was awarded the Centenary Medal for "service to the Clean Up Australia Campaign and the Clean up the World Campaign". In 2006 Kiernan received a Lifetime Achievement Award from the National Trust of Australia (NSW). The 2007 Reader's Digest "Most Trusted Poll" voted Clean Up Australia as the country's most trusted environmental charity and Kiernan as the fourth "most trustworthy" Australian. In 2008 in the same poll Kiernan was ranked number three.

Kiernan was also the recipient of Toastmasters International Communications and Leadership Award, the Berger-Sullivan Tourism Award, the International Banksia Award and the 1999 Building World Citizenship Award.

Controversy
In 2014, Kiernan pleaded guilty to a DUI charge in Sydney, following a previous charge for the same offence in 1998. This record was cited by the New South Wales Government when Kiernan was overlooked for the honour of having a Sydney ferry named after him.

Death
He died on 16 October 2018 in Sydney at the age of 78. He is survived by his daughters Sally and Pip and son Jack.

References

1940 births
2018 deaths
Recipients of the Medal of the Order of Australia
Officers of the Order of Australia
Recipients of the Centenary Medal
Australian of the Year Award winners
Australian builders
Australian environmentalists
Australian soccer chairmen and investors
Australian people of Irish descent
People educated at Scots College (Sydney)
Single-handed circumnavigating sailors
Australian republicans